Scopula brookesae is a moth of the family Geometridae. It is endemic to Borneo.

References

Moths described in 1976
Moths of Borneo
brookesae